Dylan Emery (born 31 March 2001) is a Welsh professional snooker player. The winner of the 2021 EBSA European Under-21 Snooker Championships, he defeated Julien Leclercq in the final, 5–2. As a result of this win, he has earned a place on the professional World Snooker Tour from the 2022–23 snooker season.

Emery also won the delayed 2020 Welsh Amateur Championship, defeating Paul Davies 8–6. Called up as a last-minute replacement for the 2022 Turkish Masters, Emery defeated Alfie Burden 5–0 to qualify for the event. He then met John Higgins, who beat him 5–2, with Higgins suggesting he would do well on the tour the following season.

Performance and rankings timeline

Career finals

Amateur finals: 6 (4 titles)

References

Welsh snooker players
2001 births
Living people